General War Commissioner (from German Generalkriegskommissarius) was a military office in various German states as well as in Denmark-Norway. It was the military officer in charge of national conscription, collection of war contributions, equipment, provisioning, payroll and military discipline. Their subordinates, with responsibility for specific regions, were called War Commissioners. The position of General War Commissioner was usually of equal rank to that of a General.

The position was created in Denmark-Norway in the 17th century. In Norway it existed from 1640 to 1990.

References

Military history of Germany
Military history of Denmark
Military history of Norway
Denmark–Norway